Sol En Si which is short for Solidarité Enfants Sida in French (translated as Solidarity Children AIDS) is a French charity organization founded in 1990 by Myriam Mercy et Alain Danand for helping children suffering from AIDS and their families.

60% of the funding is from public sources and 40% on private charities and donations and enjoys widespread long-running support from many individuals, most notably celebrities Zazie and Vincent Baguian.

"Sol En Si" has a team of 30 full-time employees and professionals and hundreds of volunteers who provide help in two service centers in Bobigny (near Paris) and in Marseille and in hundreds of homes, providing individualised care for the children in their family environment. Help includes providing of medical aid, social aid, beds, food and clothing, individualised accompaniment, sponsoring, support groups, organized vacations.

Sol En Si also has international operations outside France, providing schooling of children orphaned because of AIDS in Benin in addition to various other AIDS/HIV charity projects mainly on the African continent.

References

Health charities in France
HIV/AIDS organizations